Coleophora tamara is a moth of the family Coleophoridae.

References

tamara
Moths described in 1994